Sauce andalouse is a Belgian condiment commonly served with Belgian fries. The sauce is also popular and widely used throughout France. It consists of mayonnaise, tomato paste, and peppers (such as pimientos or (roasted) bell pepper). Some recipes use velouté or espagnole sauce instead of mayonnaise.

See also
 Algérienne sauce
 List of sauces

References

External links
Recipe at Epicurious

Belgian sauces
Mayonnaise